This List of investigations, resignations, suspensions, and dismissals in conjunction with the news media phone hacking scandal is a chronological listing of investigations, actual and considered, into illegal acquisition of confidential information or cover-up by employees or other agents of news media companies in conjunction with the phone hacking scandal. Investigations listed here concern interception of voicemail, hacking of computers, obtaining confidential information under false pretenses, and payments to officials. Dates in parentheses indicate approximately when each investigation was initiated or considered.

Prior to 2010 investigations focused on just a few individuals, even though there was evidence of many people being engaged in illegal activity. "The lead investigator in Operation Motorman, a 2006 inquiry...said that his team were told not to interview journalists involved. The investigator...accused authorities of being too 'frightened' to tackle journalists." In August 2006, the Metropolitan Police Service (Scotland Yard) seized from a private investigator (Glenn Mulcaire) “11,000 pages of handwritten notes listing nearly 4,000 celebrities, politicians, sports stars, police officials and crime victims whose phone may have been hacked by News of the World.” These documents remained largely unevaluated until the autumn of 2010, even though “senior Scotland Yard officials assured Parliament, judges, lawyers, potential hacking victims, the news media and the public that there was no evidence of widespread hacking by the tabloid.” Testimony indicated that “the police agency and News International … became so intertwined that they wound up sharing the goal of containing the investigation. Through March 2011, no News of the World executives or reporters other than Goodman were questioned.

By September 2012, The Metropolitan Police had a total of 185 officers investigating illegal acquisition of confidential information at a cost estimated at £9 million for 2012 and £40 million forecast over four years. This included 96 officers investigating under Operation Weeting, 70 under Operation Elveden and 19 under Operation Tuleta.

By law enforcement organizations

 UK Metropolitan Police Operation Nigeria; (May 1999-September 1999) surveillance of Southern Investigations run by the anti-corruption squad CIB3.
 UK Metropolitan Police Operation Glade; (2003) Followed up on evidence obtained in Operation Motorman
 US FBI Investigation; (2004) computer hacking
 UK Metropolitan Police Investigation; (2006) headed by Andy Hayman and limited to Clive Goodman and Glenn Mulcaire
 UK Metropolitan Police Review; (2009) decision made by John Yates not to reopen/broaden the 2006 investigation
 US FBI Investigation; (2010) probe into a group of hackers who reportedly stole compromising pictures and video from the computers and mobile devices of up to 50 celebs.
 UK Metropolitan Police Operation Weeting; (26 January 2011) interception of voicemail. Run by Sue Akers, a Deputy Assistant Commissioner with the Metropolitan Police. Akers's investigation team consists of 45 officers.
 UK Metropolitan Police Operation Tuleta; (10 June 2011) computer hacking and breaches of privacy not covered by the two parallel Met investigations into phone hacking (Weeting), and into corruption of public officials (Elveden).  Tuleta handled acquisition of confidential information from stolen mobile phones.
 UK Metropolitan Police Operation Elveden; (6 July 2011) investigation into bribery, corruption supervised by the Independent Police Complaints Commission.  Initial focus was on News of the World personnel but expanded in 2012 to cover potentially inappropriate payments by journalists at Trinity Mirror, the publisher of the Daily Mirror, Sunday Mirror and The People, and Northern & Shell, publisher of the Daily Express, Sunday Express, Daily Star and Daily Star Sunday.
 UK Metropolitan Police Inquiry; (July 2011) Initiated by former commissioner Sir Paul Stephenson "to examine the ethical considerations that should underpin relations between the Metropolitan police and the media." Led by Elizabeth Filkin, the former Parliamentary Commissioner for Standards, and "aims to draw up a framework for how officers operate in their contact with journalists."
 UK Strathclyde Police Operation Rubicon; (22 July 2011) perjury, phone hacking, and breaches of data protection in Scotland Fifty Strathclyde Police officers assigned. Led by Detective Superintendent John McSporran.
 US FBI Investigation; (14 July 2011) interception of voicemail
 US Department of Justice; (July 2011) "considering need" regarding bribery of foreign officials
 Australian Federal Police; (July 2011) "evaluating referrals"
 US FBI Investigation; (August 2011) computer hacking
 Durham Police; (Summer 2011) "outside police force to conduct a review of Operation Weeting...Jon Stoddart, chief constable of Durham constabulary, has agreed to undertake the review. The review team will be taken from a number of forces outside the MPS" (Metropolitan Police Service).
 Metropolitan Police Directorate of Professional Standards (DPS) (16 September 2011) DPS, responsible for investigating complaints against the professional conduct of Met officers, initiated an investigation of possible leaks by Met officers to The Guardian that led to the public disclosure that Milly Dowler's voicemail had been illegally intercepted. In its application for production orders, DPS cited the Official Secrets Act, an unusual use of this Act that has severe penalties, as well as the Police and Criminal Evidence Act (PACE) in its order to require reporter Nick Davies and others to disclose sources. It was the Milly Dowler disclosure that inflamed public opinion against phone hacking and led to the resignations of top Met officials, commissioner Sir Paul Stephenson and assistant commissioner John Yates. Four days later, in the face of strong negative reaction from politicians, lawyers, and the press, the Met decided not to pursue the application for production orders.
 UK Metropolitan Police (by February 2012) Operation Kalmyk; illegal access to computers; acknowledged by Sue Akers, a Deputy Assistant Commissioner with the Metropolitan Police.  May include investigation of Philip Campbell Smith who may have hacked a former British army intelligence officer's computer in 2006 on behalf of News of the World.
 Independent Police Complaints Commission (28 June 2011); inquiry as to whether two senior Surrey police officers became aware as early as 2002 that Milly Dowler's mobile phone had been hacked and did not act on this information.  Deputy Chief Constable Craig Denholm was second most senior officer at Surrey police and in overall charge of the Dowler disappearance/murder investigation named "Operation Ruby".  He later worked for Metropolitan police assistant commissioner John Yates up until shortly before Yates made his cursory 2009 review and determined there was no basis for further investigation into phone hacking.  Detective Superintendent Maria Woodall was the detective chief inspector in operational charge of the Dowler investigation from 2006 onwards.
 UK Metropolitan Police (by April 2012) Operation Sacha, which relates to the arrest of Rebekah Brooks, her husband Charlie and others for alleged conspiracy to pervert the course of justice.
 UK Metropolitan Police (by April 2012) Operation Kilo, which relates to leaks from phone-hacking investigation Operation Weeting.

By national government bodies

 UK Information Commissioner's Office Operation Motorman; (November 2002)
 UK Commons Culture, Media and Sport Committee Inquiry; (2009) phone hacking
 UK Independent Police Complaints Commission Inquiry; (2009) regarding John Yates's handling of the phone-hacking review in 2009.
 UK Commons Culture, Media and Sport Committee Inquiry; (September 2010) phone hacking
 UK Home Affairs Select Committee Inquiry; (1 September 2010) phone hacking
 UK Commons Culture, Media and Sport Committee Inquiry; (2011) "currently restricted to looking at whether it was "previously misled in the evidence we were given in relation to the News of the World."
 UK Independent Police Complaints Commission Inquiry; (July 2011) "whether John Yates used his position to help get Neil Wallis's daughter a job at Scotland Yard.
 UK Information Commissioner's Office Investigation; (July 2011) Looking into use of private investigators by Ministers of Parliament.
 UK Public inquiry; (July 2011) chaired by Lord Justice Leveson Looking into "the extent of unlawful or improper conduct within News International and other newspaper organisations, the way the police first investigated the phone-hacking scandal and whether police officers received corrupt payments."
 US Congressional Inquiry called for; (July 2011) Citizens for Responsibility and Ethics in Washington(CREW) sent a letter "to the heads of four congressional committees appealing for the legislature to investigate whether Murdoch's papers in the UK or the US were involved in illegal actions against American citizens."
 Australian Parliamentary Inquiry called for; (July 2011) "The Greens...have called for a parliamentary inquiry into News Limited, Mr Murdoch's Australian firm."
 UK Electoral Commission Inquiry called for; (August 2011) by "Labour MP Tom Watson regarding Andy Coulson's receiving "several hundred thousand pounds from his former employer News International after he was hired by the Conservative party." The Electoral Commission declined to investigate because there was "no evidence that Conservative party breached electoral law by failing to declare payments."
 UK Public Administration Select Committee Inquiry; (26 August 2011) To "consider the vetting procedures for new special advisers and how to avoid conflicts of interests after... revelations that [Andy] Coulson, a former editor of News of the World, was paid by News International while employed by the Conservative party.
 UK Her Majesty's Inspectorate of Constabulary Inquiry (1 September 2011) To address "alleged corruption and abuse of power" in police relationships with the media"...ordered by Home Secretary Theresa May and "led by a former chief constable of Essex, Roger Baker. His remit will range from payments made to custody sergeants for tip-offs about arrests, to buying drinks and providing lavish hospitality for officers."
 Australian Parliamentary (14 September 2011) Announced inquiry into media regulation to be "headed by former judge Ray Finkelstein.... The inquiry will shed light on the real pressures facing media organisations today and enable us to consider what regulatory or legislative changes might be needed in order to ensure that Australia continues to benefit from strong independent and diverse media... Due to report back by 28 February 2012. Mr Finkelstein will be assisted by journalism academic Matthew Ricketson."
 UK Office of Communications (Ofcom) Inquiry (23 April 2012) Announced it is investigating Sky News to see if it broke broadcasting rules by hacking emails to get a story and whether there is a "public interest" justification.

By private organizations

 UK Press Complaints Commission (PCC) Inquiry; (2007) Report concludes phone message tapping should stop but that "there is a legitimate place for the use of subterfuge when there are grounds in the public interest to use it and it is not possible to obtain information through other means." News of the World editor Colin Myler told the PCC that Goodman's hacking was "aberrational", "a rogue exception," done by a single journalist. Sir Christopher Meyer, then chairman of the PCC, "promised to investigate 'the entire newspaper and magazine industry of the UK to establish what is their practice' but opted not to question Andy Coulson on the grounds that he had resigned, and not to question any other journalist or editorial executive on the paper, apart from Myler, who necessarily had no direct knowledge of what had been going on before his arrival. The PCC's subsequent report failed to uncover any evidence of any phone hacking by any media organisation beyond that revealed at Goodman's trial." The Daily Mail alone made 985 requests, more than any other paper. After the conviction of Whittamore, the Information Commission, which is responsible for policing confidential databases, urged the Press Complaints Commission to issue "a clear public statement warning journalists and editors of the very real risks of committing criminal offences." Documents released under the Freedom of Information Act show that the PCC, which is funded by newspapers, resisted doing this and finally produced guidance which the Information Commission has publicly described as "disappointing".
 UK Press Complaints Commission Inquiry; (2009) "Concerned with whether it was misled by the News of the World during its 2007 investigation, and whether there is any evidence that phone message hacking has taken place since 2007." Its report concluded the PCC was not misled and that there is no evidence of ongoing phone hacking. This report and its conclusions were withdrawn on 6 July 2011.
 UK Solicitors Regulation Authority Inquiry; (22 July 2011)

By news media companies

 News International/Burton Copeland Investigation; (8 August 2005) On the day the Met seized documents from Goodman and Mulcaire and arrested both of them for conspiracy to intercept communications without lawful authority, News of the World editors said they were stunned and vowed to conduct an internal investigation. On 6 March 2007, Les Hinton advised the Commons Culture, Media, and Sport Committee that "a full, rigorous internal inquiry" is ongoing." Asked whether Goodman was the only person who knew about the phone hacking, Hinton replied that he believed Goodman was. In 2009, Colin Myler testified at the Commons Culture, Media and Sport Committee hearing that the firm of Burton Copeland was engaged "to absolutely oversee the investigation to cooperate with police...a very thorough investigation took place where there was a thorough review of everything from how cash payments were processed." Tom Crone testified that "Burton Copeland were in the office virtually every day...their remit was that they were brought in to go over everything and find out what had gone wrong, to liaise with the police...They were given absolutely free-range to ask whatever they wanted to ask." Andy Coulson testified that "I brought in Burton Copeland... to do an investigation. We opened up the files as much as we could. There was nothing they asked for that they were not given." As of August 2011, News International had not waived privilege with respect to Burton Copeland and their investigation. Linklaters replaced Burton Copeland in representing News International in July 2011. Linklaters sent a letter to the Commons Culture, Media and Sport Committee in August 2011 stating "Burton Copeland did not conduct an investigation into phone hacking at the News of the World and their role was 'only about helping the police'... [but] Scotland Yard received 'very little material' from News International and Burton Copeland."
 News International Email Review by Jonathan Chapman and Daniel Cloke; Reviewed a limited number of emails which were made available to them" through an electronic folder of emails assembled by News International's IT department." and which were subsequently made available to Harbottle & Lewis for review. Chapman states they were not "tasked with looking for evidence of any other potentially illegal activities" but had they come across evidence "of either voicemail interception or any other criminal activity," they would have reported it to their employer.
 News International Email Review by Harbottle & Lewis; (March 2007) Limited by News International to Clive Goodman's claim of unfair dismissal, limited to emails made available to Harbottle & Lewis by News International, and limited to determining whether others at News International were aware of Clive Goodman's illegal activity or were engaged in similar activity. This inquiry specifically did not include "(i)... email traffic between Mr. Goodman and several other key senior reporters and editorial executives, current and former, at the News of the World... (ii) ...emails from and to Mr. Mulcaire and (iii)...staff interviews and a review of cash payments."
 News Corp Investigation; (18 July 2011) Management and Standards Committee (MSC) Chairman Lord Anthony Grabiner will report to Joel Klein, Executive Vice President and News Corp Board director, who in turn will report to Viet Dinh, a Director and Chairman of News Corp’s Nominating and Corporate Governance Committee.
 Australia's News Limited (July 2011) "Launched a review of all payments made by the group in the last three years."
 Daily Mirror Investigation; (26 July 2011) "Six-week review...led by Trinity Mirror's group legal director Paul Vickers...to include all of the group's national and regional newspapers, including the Daily Mirror, Sunday Mirror, The People, and the Daily Record."

Resignations, suspensions, and dismissals

This is a chronological listing of resignations, suspensions, and dismissals made in conjunction with the phone hacking scandal. The list does not include approximately 200 staff members who lost their positions when News of the World discontinued operations on 10 July 2011. Dates indicate when the resignation, suspension, or dismissal occurred.

 Goodman, Clive; (2 February 2007) dismissed from News of the World
 Kuttner, Stuart; (3 July 2009) resigned from News of the World
 Evans, Dan; (April 2010) suspended as reporter for News of the World
 Edmundson, Ian; (January 2011) suspended from News of the World
 Coulson, Andy; (21 January 2011) resigned as Chief Press Secretary to David Cameron.
 Jacobs, Lawrence; (8 June 2011) resigned as general counsel at News Corporation
 Crone, Tom; (13 July 2011) left senior legal position at News International
 Brooks, Rebekah; (15 July 2011) resigned CEO of News International
 Hinton, Les; (15 July 2011) resigned as CEO of Dow Jones & Company
 Stephenson, Paul; (17 July 2011) resigned as Commissioner of the Metropolitan Police Service "after it emerged that the Met had given a contract to Neil Wallis, the former deputy editor of the News of the World, who was later arrested on suspicion of phone hacking."
 Yates, John; (18 July 2011) resigned as Assistant Commissioner of the Metropolitan Police Service
 Nixson, Matt; (21 July 2011) dismissed as reporter from The Sun  He was thought to have paid £750 to a prison guard for information about Ian Huntley while working for News of the World.  He sued News International and their Management Standards Committee for wrongful dismissal but was reportedly in discussions about rejoining The Sun as of July 2012.
 Buscombe, Peta; (29 July 2011) resigned as chairman of the Press Complaints Commission
 Dick Fedorcio; (10 August 2011) director of public affairs and internal communication for the Metropolitan Police "put on extended leave pending the result of an investigation by the Independent Police Complaints Commission (IPCC)...into Fedorcio's dealings with Neil Wallis, a former News of the World assistant editor who was arrested in July as part of Scotland Yard's investigation into phone hacking."
 Adam Smith; (25 April 2012) special adviser to Culture Secretary Jeremy Hunt resigned after release of email correspondence between Smith and Frederic Michel, News Corp’s European head of affairs, containing confidential information suggesting that "an intense and cozy relationship" existed between the culture minister's office and one of James Murdoch’s close advisers during a highly sensitive bid process involving BSykB.

References

News Corporation scandal
Investigation, resignations